Mexico was a neutral country in World War I, which lasted from 1914 to 1918. The war broke out in Europe in August 1914 as the Mexican Revolution was in the midst of full-scale civil war between factions that had helped oust General Victoriano Huerta from the presidency earlier that year. The Constitutionalist Army of Venustiano Carranza under the generalship of Alvaro Obregón defeated the army of Pancho Villa in the Battle of Celaya in April 1915.

Background
After the Battle of Celaya in April 1915, the violence in Mexico was largely restricted to local fights, especially guerrilla fights in Morelos under the leadership of Emiliano Zapata. The partial peace allowed a new Mexican Constitution to be drafted in 1916 and proclaimed on February 5, 1917. Foreign oil companies felt threatened by the new constitution, which empowered the Mexican government to expropriate natural resources deemed vital to the nation. Mexico was in constant threat of being invaded by the U.S., which wanted to take control of Tehuantepec Isthmus and Tampico oil fields. Germany made several attempts to incite a war between Mexico and the U.S., seen especially in the Zimmermann Telegram affair in January 1917, where the aim was to draw the U.S. into conflict on its southern border rather than join Great Britain and France in the conflict against Germany and its allies.

Relationship with the United States
Mexican neutrality in the Great War reflected a hostility toward the U.S., due to several earlier U.S. interventions in Mexico. In February 1913, Victoriano Huerta had conspired with the U.S. ambassador Henry Lane Wilson to oust Francisco I. Madero from the presidency of Mexico. The coup d'état was the culmination of violence in Mexico City, known as the Ten Tragic Days (La decena trágica), in the waning days of the William Howard Taft presidency. President Woodrow Wilson also ordered the invasion of Veracruz in 1914, resulting in the death of 170 Mexican soldiers and an unknown number of civilians.

The relationship between Woodrow Wilson and Venustiano Carranza, whose political position had been aided by U.S. recognition in October 1915, allowing U.S. arms sales to Carranza's faction against its main rival General Pancho Villa, was initially cordial. Villa retaliated arms dealers in Columbus, New Mexico because he had been sold faulty weapons and powder that resulted in the death of his men in battle. In the 1916 attack, 17 Americans were killed when they would not return their money or supply replacement weapons. Although it occurred on American soil, it was not an attack on the US government.  The media reported it differently. Wilson sent U.S. Army General John J. Pershing into Mexico for punitive action to capture Villa. The Pancho Villa Expedition destroyed Villa's militia but failed to capture Villa himself. The expedition stalled and Carranza, a strong nationalist, demanded Pershing's withdrawal from Mexican soil. Wilson complied and the expedition was ended,having never apprehended Villa.
U.S. interests were threatened by the proclamation of the Mexican Constitution of 1917 and Mexico was in constant threat of being invaded by the U.S.

Extent of involvement in the war
These facts marked the participation of Mexico in the Great War. 
 The Carranza government was de jure recognized by Germany at the beginning of 1917 and by the U.S. on August 31, 1917, the latter as a direct consequence of the Zimmermann telegram in an effort to ensure Mexican Neutrality in the Great War. After the occupation of Veracruz in 1914, Mexico was unwilling to participate militarily alongside the U.S., maintaining Mexican neutrality was the best the U.S. could hope for.
 Carranza granted guarantees to German companies for keeping their operations open, specifically in Mexico City, but he was at the same time selling oil to the British fleet. In fact, 75 percent of the fuel used by the Royal Navy came from Mexico.
 Carranza rejected the proposal of a military alliance with Germany, made via the Zimmermann Telegram, and he was at the same time able to prevent a permanent military invasion from the U.S., which wanted to take control of Tehuantepec Isthmus and Tampico oil fields. Mexico was producing 55 million barrels of petroleum by 1917. Carranza gave the order to destroy and set fire to the oil fields in case of a U.S. invasion.
 Carranza's troops confronted and defeated John J. Pershing in the Battle of Carrizal. General Pershing was furious at this result and asked for permission to attack the Carrancista garrison at Chihuahua. President Wilson, fearing that such an attack would provoke a full-scale war with Mexico, refused. The Battle of Carrizal marked the effective end of the Punitive Expedition.

References

Sources
 Mexico and the United States in the oil controversy, 1917–1942. University of Texas Press, 1977
 Threats of Intervention: US-Mexican Relations, 1917–1923. iUniverse, 2000.
 Básicos. Historia Universal 2, Ed. Santillana, 2007
 Historia de México II, Ed, Santillana, 2008

External links
 Articles relating to Mexico at the International Encyclopedia of the First World War.
 Scheuzger, Stephan: Mexican Revolution, in: 1914-1918-online. International Encyclopedia of the First World War.
 Rinke, Stefan: Zimmermann Telegram, in: 1914-1918-online. International Encyclopedia of the First World War.

World War I
World War I by country